Blues Beach is an unincorporated community in Hampshire County in the U.S. state of West Virginia. Blues Beach is a predominantly river camp community located south of Springfield and north of Wappocomo on West Virginia Route 28 along the South Branch Potomac River. Blues Beach is also the location of the John Blue Bridge, commonly referred to as "Blue Beach Bridge." Long Road (West Virginia Secondary Route 28/4) intersects with WV 28 here.

References 

Unincorporated communities in Hampshire County, West Virginia
Populated places on the South Branch Potomac River
Unincorporated communities in West Virginia